"Hallo Bandoeng" is a song by the Dutch levenslied singer Willy Derby (real name: Willem Frederik Christiaan Dieben, 1886-1944). It was released in 1929 and sold more than 50,000 copies, an astronomical number for that time. It was one of Derby's songs that became part of Dutch culture. The phrase "Hallo Bandoeng" was well known at that time, as the usual opening used by Radio Kootwijk when establishing a connection with Bandung (in Dutch: "Bandoeng"), one of the most important cities in the then Dutch East Indies.

Narrative
The song tells the story of an old woman, who spends the last of her money at Radio Kootwijk so that, for the first time in years, she can hear the voice of her son, who lives in Bandoeng with his "little brown wife" and their children. In the refrain, the son greets his mother and, with a sob, she greets her dearest boy. The son asks how she's doing ("how are you, old woman"), but her answer is only that she misses him so much. When the woman asks about his wife, her son tells her that they talk about her every day and that the children pray for the granny they've never met each evening and kiss her portrait before going to sleep. In only four more years he'll be back in Holland and will hug her. He then tells her that his youngest son is with him and the boy greets her: "dear grandmother, tabe, tabe" (a greeting in Indonesian). Upon hearing this the woman thanks the Lord for allowing her to have heard her grandsons voice and collapses crying. The last version of the refrain is modified. The son calls his mother again, but only hears a sob. The last sentence has the woman dead and the child calling "Tabe".

Original lyrics

References

Dutch pop songs
Dutch-language songs
Songs about Indonesia
Levenslied songs
1929 songs